Maywood is a village in Proviso Township, Cook County, Illinois, United States in the Chicago metropolitan area. It was founded on April 6, 1869, and organized October 22, 1881. The population was 23,512 at the 2020 United States Census.

History

There was limited European-American settlement in the Maywood area before a railroad was built after the American Civil War, which stimulated the rise of Chicago. At least one house in what became Maywood is known to have been used as a station on the Underground Railroad, to aid refugee African-American slaves in escaping to freedom in the North. Some settled in the free state of Illinois; others went on to Canada, which had abolished slavery, seeking further distance from slavecatchers. The site of the former house has been nationally commemorated. The plaque is located at today's Lake Street and the Des Plaines River bridge.

This early West Side suburb of Chicago was developed along the oldest railway line that led away from the city. It attracted real estate developers because of its open grass prairie and scattered groves of ancient trees.

In 1868, Vermont businessmen established the Maywood Company. In 1870 it organized the platting of streets, and began construction on the north side of the Chicago Great Western railroad tracks. The company planted 20,000 eight-year-old, nursery-grown trees to enhance the future town. By 2010, the last of these 148-year-old trees had succumbed to the emerald ash borer.

The oldest documented ash tree in northeast Illinois is in Maywood and is dated at 250 years old. It is being protected from the borers with horticultural treatment. The danger is expected to pass locally by year 2020, as it already has in Canton, Michigan, where borers were first seen. The ash is nicknamed "The Great Dane", after Jens Jensen, founder of the Midwest's prairie ecology movement a century ago. The tree is located within old growth woods just behind Proviso East high school.

With settlement underway, the village was founded on October 22, 1881, by Colonel William T. Nichols. He named it after his late daughter, May, and the groves.

Many century-old homes survive here in relatively unaltered condition. Maywood boasts 17 homes and properties listed on the National Register of Historic Places.

At one time two airports operated in Maywood. Loyola University Medical Center was developed on the site of one former airport, at the southwest corner of First Avenue and Roosevelt Road. It was the airfield used by Charles Lindbergh during his days as an airmail pilot.

Checkerboard Field was located at the southeastern corner of that intersection and was a private field. The land has been converted to a forest preserve meadow. There was some apparent consolidation of the fields in later years. Later, an automobile board racetrack was located here, along with a viewing grandstand. Barney Oldfield raced on the track. The Hines Veterans Hospital constructed one of its buildings on the foundation of the former grandstand.

Maywood in World War II

Maywood was established as the base for the 33rd Tank Company, Illinois National Guard. The Armory was located on Madison Street, two blocks east of First Avenue. It was organized on 3 May 1929 with the purpose of training men for combat. On 25 November 1940, 122 men of the 33rd Tank Company were inducted into active service to become Company B of the famous 192nd Tank Battalion, which fought in the Philippine islands. Many of these American soldiers were taken prisoner by the Japanese and died in April 1942 on the Bataan Death March. Of the 122 men of Company B, only 41 survived the war to return to Maywood. Their sacrifice has been honored with an annual Bataan Day Parade.

Given such losses, Ian Smith, who headed the history department at Proviso East High School, said that "World War II hit the town of Maywood really hard."

Historic homes and buildings

Fred Hampton, president of the Illinois chapter of the Black Panthers Party in the late 1960s, lived as a child in Maywood with his family for ten years. With the Black Panthers, he initiated community education and health programs for children, food for needy families, and other developmental projects. He was killed at the age of 21 in December 1969 in a police raid at his apartment in Chicago. In 2019, his family and supporters initiated a GoFundMe campaign to buy and restore his childhood house, to operate as a museum and community center. As of March 2021, they had exceeded their fundraising goal.

Geography

Neighboring villages are Broadview to the south, Forest Park and River Forest to the east, Melrose Park to the north, and Bellwood to the west.

Demographics
As of the 2020 census there were 23,512 people, 7,634 households, and 5,065 families residing in the village. The racial makeup of the village was 61.05% African American, 7.35% White, 1.49% Native American, 0.57% Asian, 0.05% Pacific Islander, 20.05% from other races, and 9.45% from two or more races. Hispanic or Latino of any race were 34.03% of the population.

There were 7,634 households, out of which 44.92% had children under the age of 18 living with them, 35.68% were married couples living together, 24.09% had a female householder with no husband present, and 33.65% were non-families. 27.94% of all households were made up of individuals, and 11.33% had someone living alone who was 65 years of age or older. The average household size was 3.86 and the average family size was 3.04.

The village's age distribution consisted of 20.8% under the age of 18, 11.2% from 18 to 24, 27.1% from 25 to 44, 26.9% from 45 to 64, and 13.9% who were 65 years of age or older. The median age was 37.4 years. For every 100 females, there were 96.8 males. For every 100 females age 18 and over, there were 91.0 males.

The median income for a household in the village was $56,623, and the median income for a family was $64,212. Males had a median income of $33,250 versus $30,324 for females. The per capita income for the village was $23,725. About 9.6% of families and 11.7% of the population were below the poverty line, including 16.9% of those under age 18 and 11.5% of those age 65 or over.

Note: the US Census treats Hispanic/Latino as an ethnic category. This table excludes Latinos from the racial categories and assigns them to a separate category. Hispanics/Latinos can be of any race.

Education
Maywood-Melrose Park-Broadview School District 89 operates elementary and middle schools. Proviso Township High Schools District 209 operates high schools, with Proviso East High School being located in Maywood.

Emerson Elementary School is an elementary school in Maywood. Enrollment as of 2006 was 476 students. The school teaches grades kindergarten through fifth grade. Other elementary schools in Maywood include Garfield, Lincoln, Washington Dual Language Academy and Irving Middle School. Maywood residents may apply to Proviso Math & Science Academy in Forest Park.

Triton College is the area community college.

Infrastructure

Transportation

Public Transportation 
The Village of Maywood is served by the Metra commuter railroad Union Pacific/West Line. Trains go east to Ogilvie Transportation Center in Chicago and as far west as Elburn, Illinois. Travel time from Maywood station to Ogilvie is 22 to 27 minutes. There are 13 inbound trains on weekdays, five on Saturdays and four on Sundays. Maywood station is in the heart of Maywood's business district. Maywood is also served by Melrose Park station, located on the border of Maywood and Melrose Park on the west side of town.

Pace Bus serves Maywood with lines and stops throughout the Village.

Illinois Prairie Path 
The Illinois Prairie Path is a multi-use nature trail for non-motorized public use: it stretches for approximately 61 miles in Cook, DuPage and Kane counties in northeastern Illinois. It was the first U.S. rail-to-trail conversion in the nation in the 1960s, adapting a former right-of-way for the old Chicago Aurora & Elgin electric railroad.

In Maywood, the path runs between North and South Maywood Drive on the west side of town and along the Adams Street right-of way.

Motor vehicle and air travel 
Interstate 290, the Eisenhower Expressway, bisects (north and south) the town as it goes from Chicago west to join Interstate 294, the Tri-State Tollway, in Hillside. Maywood is located between O'Hare and Midway airports.

Notable people

 Naima Adedapo, singer
 Harry Julian Allen, director of NASA Ames Research Center
 Barbara Berger, catcher in All-American Girls Professional Baseball League; sister of Norma Berger
 Norma Berger, pitcher in the All-American Girls Professional Baseball League; sister of Barbara Berger
 Donnie Boyce, Atlanta Hawks basketball NBA player
 Jim Brewer, professional NBA basketball player
 Dee Brown, professional NBA basketball player
 Shannon Brown, professional NBA basketball player
 Sterling Brown, professional NBA basketball player
 Ray Buchanan, professional football player
 Walter Burley Griffin, architect, designer of Canberra, capital city of Australia.
 Jevon Carter, professional basketball player
 Eugene Cernan, astronaut, walked on the Moon during the Apollo 17 mission
 Michael Curry, presiding bishop of Episcopal Church
 Bill Donovan, pitcher for Boston Braves
 Todd Dulaney, gospel musician
 Michael Finley, professional NBA basketball player
 Dennis Franz, actor
 Craig Hall, ballet dancer
 Fred Hampton, Black Panther
 Shirley Jameson, nationally recognized speed skater and softball player, and outfielder in All-American Girls Professional Baseball League
 Sheila Crump Johnson, co-founder of BET.
 Jackie LaVine, Olympic bronze medalist in swimming
 Charles Lindbergh, aviator
 Eugene Moore, politician who served as Cook County recorder of deeds and as a member of the Illinois House of Representatives
 Ray Nitschke, professional football player, Hall of Famer
 Walter "Walt" Parazaider, saxophonist for rock band, Chicago
 John Prine, singer, musician, and award-winning songwriter
 Doc Rivers, professional basketball player, head coach of NBA's Philadelphia 76ers
 Wanda Sharp, Illinois state representative
 W.A. Yackey, decorated WWI pilot, 1920s aviator and final owner of Checkerboard Field.

 Perrion Winfrey NFL Football player

References

External links
 Village of Maywood official website

 
Villages in Illinois
Villages in Cook County, Illinois
Chicago metropolitan area
Populated places established in 1869
1869 establishments in Illinois
Majority-minority cities and towns in Cook County, Illinois